The 1986–87 Primeira Divisão was the 53rd season of top-tier football in Portugal.

Overview
It was contested by 16 teams, and S.L. Benfica won the championship.

League standings

Results

Season statistics

Top goalscorers

Footnotes

External links
 Portugal 1986-87 - RSSSF (Jorge Miguel Teixeira)
 Portuguese League 1986/87 - footballzz.co.uk
 Portugal - Table of Honor - Soccer Library 

Primeira Liga seasons
1986–87 in Portuguese football
Portugal